Tiechang may refer to the following towns in China:

 Tiechang, Longchuan County, Guangdong (铁场镇)

Written as "铁厂镇"
 Tiechang, Zunyi County, in Zunyi County, Guizhou
 Tiechang, Zunhua, Hebei
 Tiechang, Tonghua, in Erdaojiang District, Tonghua, Jilin
 Tiechang, Zhen'an County, in Zhen'an County, Shaanxi